Babis Intzoglou (born 1 April 1949) is a Greek former professional footballer who played as a defender.

Club career

Intzoglou started football at a youth level with AE Nikaia and signed his first professional deal in 1965 at Ionikos. In 1969, he played in the first division with Panionios, where his older brother Thanasis was playing Throughout his tenure with Panionios he assisted in securing the 1971 Balkans Cup for Panionios by defeating Besa Kavajë. Throughout his tenure with Panionios he featured in the 1969–70 Inter-Cities Fairs Cup, and the 1971–72 UEFA Cup, where they eliminated Atlético Madrid. In the summer of 1975 he played abroad in the Canadian National Soccer League with Toronto Homer.

In the summer of 1976, he signed for AEK Athens. Under František Fadrhonc he was converted fron a center back to a full-back, where his impact on the defense, became more effective. He was a key player in AEK's course to the semi-finals of the UEFA Cup in the 1977. He also played with the "yellow-blacks" in the next season's UEFA Cup and the 2 following seasons in the European Cup. In his 4 seasons at the club, he won 2 Championships and a Greek Cup including a domesic double in 1978.

In 1980, he played with Diagoras in the second division for three years and later returned to Ionikos, where he retired at the summer of 1984.

International career
Intzoglou was a member of the Greece U21 when it was formed for the first time in 1968 with the aim of participating in the 1st Balkan Youth Championship held at the Kaftanzoglio Stadium in Thessaloniki. In the same year he was a key member of the Greece U19 that participated in the Final phase of the European Championship held in France.

Intzoglou played with Greece in 1969, and made nine appearances. His first international appearance was on 4 May 1969, in a 2–2 away draw against Portugal for the FIFA World Cup qualifiers. He was unlucky and was replaced in the 24th minute due to injury. His last appearance in the shirt with the national emblem was on 23 March 1977 in a 4–0 away defeat by Czechoslovakia in a friendly match, in which he played until the 77th minute.

Personal life
Intzoglou's brothers Thanasis and Christos were also footballers, as well as his son, Lefteris, who also played for AEK Athens. After retiring as a footballer, he worked as a private employee in a large electrical company.

Honours

Panionios
Balkans Cup: 1971

AEK Athens
Alpha Ethniki: 1977–78, 1978–79
Greek Cup: 1977–78

Greece U21
Balkan Youth Championship: 1969

References

External links

Living people
1949 births
Greece international footballers
Ionikos F.C. players
Panionios F.C. players
AEK Athens F.C. players
Diagoras F.C. players
Super League Greece players
Football League (Greece) players
Canadian National Soccer League players
Association football defenders
Footballers from Piraeus
Greek expatriate footballers
Expatriate soccer players in Canada
Greek expatriate sportspeople in Canada
Greek footballers